Eric Stewart (born December 6, 1971) is an American politician from Tennessee, who represented the 14th district as State Senator from 2008 to 2012. His district included all or parts of Bledsoe, Coffee, Franklin, Grundy, Sequatchie, Van Buren and Warren counties.

Political career 
Prior to his election to the State Senate, Stewart served as a Franklin County commissioner. After redistricting in 2012, his district was renumbered District 16 and lost Bledsoe County but added Marion. He lost to Republican incumbent Scott DesJarlais.

Stewart founded his own insurance agency, Eric Stewart Insurance, in Fayetteville in 1999. The agency currently operates as The Stewart Insurance Agency in Winchester, Tennessee.

2012 Congressional campaign

On November 17, 2011, Stewart announced his candidacy for Tennessee's 4th congressional district seat in the U.S. House of Representatives. He won the Democratic primary election and lost to incumbent Republican Scott DesJarlais in the general election.

References

External links
Senator Eric Stewart - District 14 official State Senate website
Eric Stewart for U.S. House of Representatives official campaign website
 
Campaign finance at OpenSecrets.org''

County commissioners in Tennessee
Democratic Party Tennessee state senators
1971 births
Living people
Austin Peay State University alumni
People from Franklin County, Tennessee